"Missile" is a song by IAMX from the album Kiss + Swallow. It was released in 2005 as a promo single with another track "This Will Make You Love Again".  The latter appeared on his 2006 album The Alternative.

Music video
Two music videos were released for "Missile." One consists almost entirely of an upside down, overhead shot of Corner in a bathtub, with his head underwater and a strip of tape over his mouth.  Over the course of the video, the message written on the tape changes from 'LOVE ME' to 'HATE ME' to 'HELP ME' as a hand appears in shot and forces his head to stay under.  The second features Corner's girlfriend at the time, Sue Denim of the band Robots in Disguise and, in keeping with IAMX's music, is highly erotic, featuring S&M and bondage, with Denim as a dominatrix of sorts, with Corner at her mercy.  The video ends with her giving him a glowing capsule and forcing him to swallow it, at the same time as the lyric "You're taking my life away" is sung.

Track listing 
Tennis Schallplatten, promo CD, 2005:

References 

2005 singles
IAMX songs
2004 songs
Songs written by Chris Corner

pl:Kiss + Swallow#Single